The Aladža Mosque, also known as Šarena džamija, "Colorful Mosque", is an Ottoman era mosque that was built in 1549 and located in Foča, Bosnia and Herzegovina. It is considered one of the most beautiful and important examples of Ottoman architecture in Europe, and is one of the most important Ottoman era mosques in all of Bosnia and Herzegovina; along with the Gazi Husrev-beg Mosque in Sarajevo and the Ferhadija Mosque in Banja Luka.
It was completely destroyed with pre-planted explovises at the beginning of the Bosnian War in 1992 by the VRS, and levelled to the ground; along with the left over stones and rubble from the mosque being hidden all over Foča to prevent it's reconstruction. After many years of searching for the stones once the Bosniak refugees of Foča began to return, and sourcing the funds necessary for the reconstruction of the mosque, its reconstruction was started in 2016, and completed in 2018.

History 

The mosque was erected in 1549 by Hasan Nezir, the Ottoman Persian supervisor of state goods and finance in Bosnia and a close associate of Mimar Sinan. The master builder was Ramadan-aga, who was trained in the Persian culture and Persian architecture. It was decorated with beautiful colors, so it was named Aladža, "the Colorful".

The mosque is more than 36 meters high and has harmonious lines, marble columns, portal, cubes, corners and chasers. It is a masterpiece of Ottoman architecture on the UNESCO World Heritage List. The ornamentation is in typical Ottoman classical architectural style, and since it was the first mosque of its kind in Bosnia and Herzegovina, its design was emulated by many others that were later built. This is one of the reasons why the Yugoslav authorities put it under state protection in 1950.

During the Ottoman period, 17 mosques were built in Foča; 5 were destroyed during World War II and 12 were destroyed during the War in Bosnia and Herzegovina. From April to June 1992, all mosques were demolished in Foča.

The mosque was blown up on 22 April 1992 by the Army of Republika Srpska and then completely demolished on 2 August 1992. Its remains were removed to the city's landfills. The area on which the mosque stood has been fenced and remained empty for the following 22 years. The first fragments of Aladža were found in 2004, along with the remains of the bodies of killed Bosniaks, in the rubble around 200 m south of the iron bridge over the Drina and around 300 m north of this bridge.

In October 2018, the Bosnian State Court charged Goran Mojović for crimes against humanity, including the destruction of the Aladža mosque. According to the prosecutor, in the course of a widespread and systematic attack by the Bosnian Serb military, paramilitary and police forces against the civilian population of the city of Foča, on the evening of August 2, 1992 Mojović, as head of the local engineering unit of the Army of Republika Srpska, gave the order to destroy the mosque, and - despite the refusal of two other soldiers - together with Rajko Milošević detonated the mosque with about 25 anti-tank mines. Thus Mojović and Milošević violated international law on the protection of civilian and cultural property.

The reconstruction of the mosque in line with the original plans was carried out between 2014 and 2018 under supervision of the Commission to preserve national monuments of Bosnia and Herzegovina. It was financed by the Turkish Cooperation (TIKA). The restored Aladža was opened on May 4, 2019, and was opened by Aziza Kurtović, a woman who lost her son during the war.

In the early morning of 18 February 2021, several gunshots were fired against the mosques minaret which  suffered minor damage.

Description 
Like the Ali Pasha Mosque in Sarajevo and the Sinan-beg Mosque in Čajniče, the mosque was built along the “classical” Ottoman style,  to which the Gazi Husrev-beg Mosque in Sarajevo can also be assigned.

Their floor plan was almost square (11.22 m by 11.30 m). The dome, which had a diameter of 11 m, rose above an octagonal drum. The height to the apex of the dome was 19.85 m. There were 5 windows in each of the three sides of the mosque, and in front of the front there was a vestibule with pointed arched arches supported by four marble columns and three domes. The minaret was 36 m high. Inside mihrab, minbar and muezzin mahfili there was an Islamic stone sculpture, which was considered the most beautiful in the Balkans (Trifunović). The mosque had picture decorations, including a rosette on the north wall with floral decoration and wall painting in the lobby.

References

Bibliography 
 Lazar Trifunović: Kunstdenkmäler in Jugoslawien, Band 1 (A-O). Ein Bildhandbuch. Leipzig 1981: Edition Leipzig, S. 368f mit Fotos 111 - 113, ohne ISBN;
 Andrej Andrejević: Aladža džamija u Foči, Filozofski fakultet u Beogradu, Institut za istoriju umetnosti, 1972, 103 Seiten, OL19219747M;
 Šemso Tucaković: Aladža džamija - fočanski biser, El-Kalem, 1991, 57 Seiten;
 Šemso Tucaković: Aladža džamija-ubijeni monument, Sarajevo: In-t za istraživanje zločina protiv čovječnosti i međunarodnog prava, 1998, 270 Seiten, .

External links 

  East Journal
 Mvslim

Buildings and structures in Foča
2010s architecture
Buildings and structures completed in 1550
Ottoman mosques in Bosnia and Herzegovina
Medieval Bosnia and Herzegovina architecture